Glyphipterix montisella is a species of sedge moth in the genus Glyphipterix. It was described by Vactor Tousey Chambers in 1875. It is found in North America, including Colorado, Arizona and California.

References

Moths described in 1875
Glyphipterigidae
Moths of North America